Copper Cove may refer to:
Copper Cove (Antarctica)
Copper Cove Subdivision, California